Clemens Ernst Gottlieb von Delbrück (19 January 1856, in Halle an der Saale – 17 December 1921, in Jena)  was a German conservative politician. He was ennobled in 1916.

Early life
He was born into a common family, and attended high school in Halle between 1873 and 1877. He studied theology at the Ruprecht-Karls-Universität Heidelberg and law at the University of Berlin. In 1882, having passed the staatsexamen, he gained a government post in Kwidzyn.

He was promoted to the office of district administrator of Tuchel in 1885 and became president of the city council of Danzig in 1891. From 1896 to 1902, he was mayor of Danzig and sat in the Prussian House of Lords. He was Oberpräsident of West Prussia from 1902 to 1905.

Career 
In 1909, von Delbrück joined the national government as the secretary of the Interior and vice-chancellor. In these positions he was distinguished by his strong opposition to the parliamentary system of the Reichstag but also his role in modernizing the German government. 

He was also vice-president of Prussia from 1914 to 1916. In 1912, he received an honorary doctorate from the University of Berlin. During the First World War, the increasing conflict between the Chancellor Theobald von Bethmann Hollweg and leading figures in the German military, especially Paul Hindenburg led to his replacement with Karl Helfferich.

Later life 
On his dismissal, he was awarded the Order of the Black Eagle and was given a letter assigning to him the status of hereditary nobleman. In 1918, he was briefly a member of the Geheimes Zivilkabinett before its dissolution at the end of the German Empire. 

Von Delbrück remained politically active after the war, and was a founding member of the German National People's Party. He was a member of the Weimar National Assembly from 1919 to 1920, and of the Reichstag from 1920 until his death.

References

External links
 

1856 births
1921 deaths
People from Halle (Saale)
People from the Province of Saxony
German Protestants
German National People's Party politicians
Members of the Prussian House of Lords
Members of the Weimar National Assembly
Members of the Reichstag of the Weimar Republic
Vice-Chancellors of Germany
Government ministers of Germany
Trade ministers of Prussia
Mayors of places in Germany
German monarchists
German untitled nobility